The 1952 Fresno State Bulldogs football team represented Fresno State College—now known as California State University, Fresno—as an independent during the 1952 college football season. 
Led by first-year head coach Clark Van Galder, the Bulldogs compiled a record of 8–2. Fresno State played home games at Ratcliffe Stadium on the campus of Fresno City College in Fresno, California.

Schedule

Team players in the NFL
The following were selected in the 1953 NFL Draft.

Notes

References

Fresno State
Fresno State Bulldogs football seasons
Fresno State Bulldogs football